4715 Medesicaste is a dark Jupiter trojan from the Trojan camp, approximately  in diameter. It was discovered on 9 October 1989, by Japanese astronomer Yoshiaki Oshima at the Gekko Observatory east of Shizuoka, Japan. The assumed C-type asteroid belongs to the 70 largest Jupiter trojans. It is possibly elongated in shape and has a rotation period of 8.8 hours. It was named from Greek mythology after Medesicaste, an illegitimate daughter of Trojan King Priam.

Orbit and classification 

Medesicaste is orbiting in the trailering Trojan camp, at Jupiter's  Lagrangian point, 60° behind the Gas Giant's orbit in a 1:1 resonance . It is also a non-family asteroid of the Jovian background population. It orbits the Sun at a distance of 4.9–5.4 AU once every 11 years and 7 months (4,218 days; semi-major axis of 5.11 AU). Its orbit has an eccentricity of 0.05 and an inclination of 19° with respect to the ecliptic. The body's observation arc begins with a precovery taken at Palomar Observatory in October 1954, or 35 years prior to its official discovery observation at Gekko.

Numbering and naming 

This minor planet was numbered by the Minor Planet Center on 30 January 1991. On 14 May 2021, the object was named by the Working Group Small Body Nomenclature (WGSBN), after Medesicaste from Greek mythology, who was an illegitimate daughter of King Priam and wife of Imbrius.

Before Medesicaste was named, it belonged to a small group of only 8 unnamed minor planets with a designated number smaller than 5000. (All of them are Jupiter trojans or near-Earth asteroids). Since then, several have already been named :

 3708 Socus  – named in May 2021
 4035 Thestor   – named in May 2021
 4489 Dracius  – named in May 2021
 
 
 4715 Medesicaste  – named in May 2021
 4835 Asaeus

Physical characteristics 

Medesicaste is an assumed C-type asteroid. It has a V–I color index of 0.85, slightly below that seen for most Jovian D-type asteroids (also seen table below).

Rotation period 

A rotational lightcurve of Medesicaste was first obtained by Stefano Mottola in November 1991, using the Loiano 1.52-meter telescope at Bologna Observatory in Italy. Lightcurve analysis gave a rotation period of  hours with a brightness amplitude of 0.46 magnitude. In September 2012, it was also observed in the R-band by astronomers at the Palomar Transient Factory in California.

Since January 2015, several photometric observations by Robert Stephens at the Center for Solar System Studies in California confirmed Mottola's period determination from 1991, and measured a brightness amplitude of 0.50–0.53, which is indicative of a non-spherical, possibly elongated shape.

Diameter and albedo 

According to the surveys carried out by the Japanese Akari satellite and the NEOWISE mission of NASA's Wide-field Infrared Survey Explorer, Medesicaste measures between 62.10 and 65.93 kilometers in diameter and its surface has an albedo between 0.060 and 0.079. It has not been observed by the Supplemental IRAS Minor Planet Survey. The Collaborative Asteroid Lightcurve Link assumes a standard albedo for a carbonaceous asteroid of 0.057 and calculates a diameter of 63.91 kilometers based on an absolute magnitude of 9.7.

Notes

References

External links 
 Lightcurve Database Query (LCDB), at www.minorplanet.info
 Discovery Circumstances: Numbered Minor Planets (1)-(5000) – Minor Planet Center
 
 

004715
Discoveries by Yoshiaki Oshima
Named minor planets
19891009